The 1992 Youngstown State Penguins football team was an American football team represented Youngstown State University as an independent during the 1992 NCAA Division I-AA football season. In their seventh season under head coach Jim Tressel, the team compiled an 11–3–1 record and lost to Marshall in the 1992 NCAA Division I-AA Football Championship Game. Youngstown appeared in the Division I-AA national championship game six times, and won the championship four times, during the 1990s.

Quarterback Nick Cochran received the team's most valuable player award. The team's statistical leaders included Cochran with 2,196 passing yards, Tamron Smith with 1,403 rushing yards and 126 points scored, and Leon Jones with 125 tackles (including 75 solo tackles).

Schedule

References

Youngstown State
Youngstown State Penguins football seasons
Youngstown State Penguins football